Toonloop is a software application for live stop-motion animation. "Live" means that the animation is constantly playing while being edited. Toonloop allows animators to create stop-motion animation, pixilation, and other animation techniques and the result is constantly seen while the user is adding images to the animation. It is a project of Alexandre Quessy with help from Tristan Matthews.

Alexandre Quessy presented artistic performances using this software at SAT and ETS in Canada and at the Piksel 09 Festival in Norway.

Toonloop is free and open-source software subject to the terms of the GNU General Public License (GPL). It is programmed in C++ and GTK+ as well as GStreamer. It has a Debian package. Toonloop was mentioned briefly at the 2009 Open Video Conference.

Toonloop has also been the topic of blogs.

Features 
Toonloop can be used to create time-lapse animations.

References

External links 

Animation software
Stop motion
Free graphics software
Stop-motion software for Linux
Software that uses GStreamer
Graphics software that uses GTK